Jack Daugherty (August 13, 1930 – February 2, 1991) was an American musician, trumpeter and producer who is best known for being the music producer of the band the Carpenters.

Life and career
For most of his early professional career, Daugherty had worked as a trumpeter in Woody Herman's band. By the 1960s, he had all but retired from the music business, working in public relations at North American Aviation, an aircraft company with a location operating in the Los Angeles area. He went on to produce three albums: Jack Daugherty and the Class of Nineteen Hundred and Seventy One (referred to by Sounds as "a supersession of the finest studio musicians in Hollywood"), on A&M Records, Carmel by the Sea, on the Monterey Label, and Romance, on Columbia Records, Japan, as his last known project.

The Carpenters
Though no longer actively involved in music, Daugherty still kept an open network with other performers throughout the years. One was John Pisano, guitarist of Herb Alpert's band The Tijuana Brass, and still a part of the A&M Records roster. Daugherty is credited with getting a demo tape of Karen and Richard Carpenter's work to Herb Alpert through Pisano.

He produced the Carpenters from 1969 with the release of Offering and continued until 1972, with the release of A Song for You. These early recordings carry the misleading credits "Produced by Jack Daugherty" or "Produced by Jack Daugherty Productions", but in reality, it was Richard who produced the records and did the arrangements and all Daugherty's contributions were limited to were booking musicians, studio time and finding potential songs, although he did offer production advice. Karen and Richard viewed him as an A&R man, not a producer, and furthermore, Richard was enraged when a Cashbox magazine review praised Daugherty's production abilities. According to Roger Nichols, Richard felt that he was producing the records and Daugherty put his name on them.

Dismissal and lawsuit against A&M
In 1972, Daugherty had his own secretary at A&M and was paid a $25,000 salary (US$ in  dollars) in addition to royalties from the Carpenters' records, but after he was fired from A&M, Daugherty sued Herb Alpert and Jerry Moss for wrongful termination and he claimed that his termination undermined his credibility in the music industry. He lost the 9-year lawsuit after the courts ruled in favor of both A&M and the Carpenters, but the defense cost the record label $350,000 (US$ in  dollars) and $400,000 (US$ in  dollars).

Final years
Despite the damaged relationship, Daugherty later set aside his differences with the band and attended the funeral of Karen Carpenter in 1983. He died on February 2, 1991, of complications during coronary bypass surgery.

Controversy over role in Carpenters' recordings
Daugherty's precise role in the Carpenters' recordings has been subjected to some controversy. When Richard was asked at a UK press conference what role Daugherty played in the duo's sound, he responded, "Nothing. That's why he's no longer with us. We produced all these singles. It's a long story, but Jack had nothing to do with anything. He was responsible for getting Herb Alpert to hear our tape, which was very nice, but he wasn't our producer. You'll notice he hasn't had one record on any chart since he left us."

Bibliography
 Coleman, Ray. The Carpenters: The Untold Story. HarperCollins, New York, 1994.

References

1991 deaths
Record producers from California
The Carpenters
1930 births
20th-century American musicians
American jazz trumpeters
American male trumpeters
American pianists
A&M Records artists
American jazz pianists
American male pianists
American male jazz musicians
20th-century American male musicians